Assail may refer to:

 Assail (Malazan), a continent in the Malazan Book of the Fallen series
 HMAS Assail (P 89), an Attack-class patrol boat
 USS Assail (AM-147), an Admirable-class minesweeper

See also

 Assail Bank
 Assailant